The Arun District Council elections, 2019 took place on Thursday 2 May 2019, electing all 54 members of the council, and taking place alongside the other local elections in England and Northern Ireland.

Summary

Election result

|-

Ward results

Aldwick East

Aldwick West

 
 
 
 
 
 

 
Martin Smith was previously elected at a by-election, gaining one of the Conservative seats.

Angmering & Findon

Arundel & Walberton

Barnham

Beach

Bersted

Brookfield

Courtwick with Toddington

 
 
 
 

 
Victoria Rhodes was elected in 2015 as a UKIP councillor.

East Preston

Felpham East

Felpham West

Ferring

Hotham

Marine

 
 
 

 
Matthew Stanley was previously elected in a by-election, gaining the Conservative seat.

Middleton-on-Sea

Orchard

Pagham

Pevensey

River

Rustington East

Rustington West

Yapton

 
 
 
 

 
Derek Ambler was elected in 2015 as a UKIP councillor.

By-elections

Brookfield

Pevensey

Barnham

References

2019 English local elections
May 2019 events in the United Kingdom
2019
2010s in West Sussex